HMCS Charlottetown is a  that has served in the Royal Canadian Navy since 1995. Charlottetown is the tenth ship in her class which is based on the Canadian Patrol Frigate Project. She is the third vessel to carry the designation . Charlottetown, assigned to Maritime Forces Atlantic (MARLANT) and homeported at CFB Halifax, serves on missions protecting Canada's sovereignty in the Atlantic Ocean and enforcing Canadian laws in its territorial sea and exclusive economic zone. Charlottetown has also participated in several NATO missions, patrolling the Atlantic Ocean as part of Standing Naval Force Atlantic (STANAVFORLANT) and its successors Standing NATO Maritime Group 1 and 2 (SNMG1 / SNMG2). Charlottetown has also been deployed on missions throughout the Atlantic and to the Indian Ocean, specifically the Persian Gulf and Arabian Sea on anti-terrorism operations.

Description and design
Charlottetown was ordered in December 1987 as part of the second batch of frigates. To reflect the changing long term strategy of the Navy during the 1980s and 1990s, the Halifax-class frigates was designed as a general purpose warship with particular focus on anti-submarine capabilities.

That made them slightly larger than the Iroquois-class destroyers. The vessels are propelled by two shafts with Escher Wyss controllable pitch propellers driven by a CODOG system of two General Electric LM2500 gas turbines, generating  and one SEMT Pielstick 20 PA6 V 280 diesel engine, generating .

The Halifax class have a complement of 198 naval personnel of which 17 are officers and 17 aircrew of which 8 are officers.

Armament and aircraft
As built the Halifax-class vessels deployed the CH-124 Sea King helicopter, which acted in concert with shipboard sensors to seek out and destroy submarines at long distances from the ships. The ships have a helicopter deck fitted with a "bear trap" system allowing the launch and recovery of helicopters in up to sea state 6. The Halifax class also carries a close-in anti-submarine weapon in the form of the Mark 46 torpedo, launched from twin Mark 32 Mod 9 torpedo tubes in launcher compartments either side of the forward end of the helicopter hangar.

As built, the anti-shipping role is supported by the RGM-84 Harpoon Block 1C surface-to-surface missile, mounted in two quadruple launch tubes at the main deck level between the funnel and the helicopter hangar. For anti-aircraft self-defence the ships are armed with the Sea Sparrow vertical launch surface-to-air missile in two Mk 48 Mod 0 eight-cell launchers placed to port and starboard of the funnel. The vessels carry 16 missiles. A Raytheon/General Dynamics Phalanx Mark 15 Mod 21 Close-In Weapon System (CIWS) is mounted on top of the helicopter hangar for "last-ditch" defence against targets that evade the Sea Sparrow.

As built, the main gun on the forecastle is a /70 calibre Mark 2 gun from Bofors. The vessels also carry eight  machine guns.

Countermeasures and sensors
The torpedo decoy is the AN/SLQ-25A Nixie towed acoustic decoy from Argon ST. The ship's radar warning receiver, the CANEWS (Canadian Electronic Warfare System), SLQ-501, and the radar jammer, SLQ-505, were developed by Thorn and Lockheed Martin Canada.

Two Thales Nederland (formerly Signaal) SPG-503 (STIR 1.8) fire control radars are installed one on the roof of the bridge and one on the raised radar platform immediately forward of the helicopter hangar. The ship is also fitted with Raytheon AN/SPS-49(V)5 long-range active air search radar operating at C and D bands, Ericsson HC150 Sea Giraffe medium-range air and surface search radar operating at G and H bands, and Kelvin Hughes Type 1007 I-band navigation radar. The sonar suite includes the CANTASS Canadian Towed Array and GD-C AN/SQS-510 hull mounted sonar and incorporates an acoustic range prediction system. The sonobuoy processing system is the GD-C AN/UYS-503.

Modernization
The Halifax class underwent a modernization program, known as the Halifax Class Modernization (HCM) program, in order to update the frigates' capabilities in combatting modern smaller, faster and more mobile threats. This involved upgrading the command and control, radar, communications, electronic warfare and armament systems. Further improvements, such as modifying the vessel to accommodate the new Sikorsky CH-148 Cyclone helicopter and satellite links will be done separately from the main Frigate Equipment Life Extension (FELEX) program.

The FELEX program comprised upgrading the combat systems integration to CMS330. The SPS-49 2D long range air search radar was replaced by the Thales Nederland SMART-S Mk 2 E/F-band 3D surveillance radar, and the two STIR 1.8 fire control radars were replaced by a pair of Saab Ceros 200 re-control radars. A Telephonics IFF Mode 5/S interrogator was installed and the Elisra NS9003A-V2HC ESM system replaced the SLQ-501 CANEWS. An IBM multi-link (Link 11, Link 16 and Link 22 enabled) datalink processing system was installed along with two Raytheon Anschütz Pathfinder Mk II navigation radars. Furthermore, Rheinmetall's Multi-Ammunition Soft kill System (MASS), known as MASS DUERAS was introduced to replace the Plessey Shield decoy system. The existing 57 mm Mk 2 guns were upgraded to the Mk 3 standard and the Harpoon missiles were improved to Block II levels, the Phalanx was upgraded to Block 1B and the obsolete Sea Sparrow system was replaced by the Evolved Sea Sparrow Missile.

Service history
Charlottetowns keel was laid down on 18 December 1993 by Saint John Shipbuilding Ltd. at Saint John, New Brunswick. The vessel was launched on 1 October 1994 and commissioned into the Canadian Forces on 9 September 1995 at Charlottetown, carrying the hull classification symbol FFH 339.

In 1996, the frigate sailed to join NATO's Standing Naval Force Atlantic (STANAVFORLANT) and performed a series of naval exercises with Eastern European nations. In 1997, after becoming the first Canadian warship to pass beneath the Confederation Bridge, the vessel participated in US naval exercises. In 1998, Charlottetown performed another stint with STANAVFORLANT beginning in February, replacing sister ship .

In January 2001, Charlottetown sailed to the Persian Gulf to join the  Carrier Battle Group, enforcing sanctions against Iraq. Following Canada's entry into the War in Afghanistan, Charlottetown was part of the initial naval task force sent to the Arabian Sea. Charlottetown was incorporated into a US amphibious ready group escorting United States Marine Corps troop transports near Pakistan. Charlottetown returned to Halifax on 27 April 2002.

In 2008 the frigate made significant narcotics interceptions. A dhow was caught loaded with four tonnes of hashish, close to Pakistani waters. The impounded vessel and crew were handed over to the Pakistan Coast Guard.

Mediterranean deployments 

On 2 March 2011, Charlottetown left its home port of Halifax to join the NATO-led air-sea Operation Unified Protector during the 2011 Libyan civil war. Charlottetown worked in conjunction with an American carrier battle group led by the aircraft carrier . The stated mission was to help restore peace, evacuate Canadian citizens in Libya and provide humanitarian relief. On 18 March the Canadian government expanded the mission by announcing that HMCS Charlottetown, in addition to six CF-18 fighter aircraft and two CC-177 transport aircraft, would constitute Canada's contribution to the enforcement of United Nations Security Council Resolution 1973, aimed to protect Libya's civilian population (Operation Mobile).

By 21 March, the Canadian Broadcasting Corporation reported that Charlottetown was patrolling the waters off north Libya. On 12 May, the frigate engaged several small boats involved in an attack on the port city of Misrata. Later that month on 30 May, the frigate came under fire from a dozen BM-21 rockets while patrolling off the Libyan coast, but no damage or injuries were reported. In July 2011,  relieved Charlottetown, which returned to Halifax.

Charlottetown departed Halifax on 8 January 2012 to join the NATO-led mission Operation Active Endeavor. The mission was an anti-terrorism deployment to the Mediterranean Sea. At the time of departure Commander Wade Carter said to the media that there were no plans for Charlottetown to intervene in the conflict in Syria. The frigate was sent to relieve HMCS Vancouver.

Maritime security operations 

Charlottetown transited the Suez Canal on 23 April 2012 to join Combined Task Force 150, conducting counter-terrorism operations in the Arabian Sea. She returned to Halifax on 11 September 2012. While on deployment, Charlottetown was the test ship for the unmanned aerial vehicle Boeing Insitu ScanEagle. During her service in the Arabian Sea one of the ScanEagle UAVs, which had been deployed from the ship, was lost due to engine failure. The navy later denied that it had been found by Iran, which had captured a ScanEagle drone around the same time. The vessel completed the FELEX modernisation in June 2014.

On 27 June 2016 Charlottetown sailed from Halifax to join NATO's Operation Reassurance in the Mediterranean Sea. While deployed overseas, twenty members of the crew contracted hand, foot, and mouth disease. In October, Charlottetown took part in the multinational naval exercise Joint Warrior off the coast of Scotland. The vessel returned to Canada on 13 January 2017 and conducted a full crew change.

Charlottetown re-deployed to Europe on 8 August 2017, relieving sister ship . Charlottetown joined Standing NATO Maritime Group One (SNMG1) in support of Operation Reassurance. During the deployment, Charlottetown patrolled the Baltic Sea in August taking part in exercise Northern Coast, on completion she transited south taking part in the NATO naval exercise Brilliant Mariner in the Mediterranean Sea in September–October. Charlottletown returned to Halifax on 19 January 2018, having visited eleven ports during the deployment. In August, Charlottetown and  departed Halifax to take part in Operation Nanook, travelling to Iqaluit, Nunavut and Nuuk, Greenland.

Lineage – Charlottetown

First of Name
 (K244)
Corvette, Revised Flower class
Commissioned 13 December 1941
Sunk by enemy action 11 September 1942

Second of Name
 (K244)
Frigate, River class
Commissioned 28 April 1944
Paid off 25 March 1947

Third of Name
This is the current ship with the name Charlottetown

References

Notes

Citations

Sources

External links

HMCS Charlottetown (FFH 339) – official website

Fleet of the Royal Canadian Navy
Halifax-class frigates
1994 ships
Ships built in New Brunswick